Gillian E. Metzger (born October 2, 1965) is a United States constitutional law scholar and a professor of law at Columbia Law School.

Early life and education 
The daughter of Columbia University history professor Walter P. Metzger, Gillian grew up on campus in faculty housing. She earned a bachelor's degree in political science from Yale University in 1987, and then worked as a legislative aide for District Council 37, a local union in New York City. Metzger then earned a master's degree in philosophy at the University of Oxford. After several years as a staff analyst for New York City government, Metzger enrolled in Columbia Law School, earning her J.D. degree in 1995.

Professional career 
After law school, Metzger first clerked with U.S. Court of Appeals for the District of Columbia Circuit judge Patricia Wald and then clerked for U.S. Supreme Court Associate Justice Ruth Bader Ginsburg.

After completing her clerkship with Ginsburg, Metzger became a staff attorney for the Brennan Center for Justice at the New York University School of Law for several years.  During her time at the Brennan Center, Metzger worked on two notable causes: challenging Florida's permanent disenfranchisement of convicted felons and defending campaign finance reform measures.  Her work on felon disenfranchisement earned her an invitation to testify before the United States House Committee on the Judiciary on October 21, 1999.

Metzger joined Columbia Law's faculty in 2001.  Her areas of expertise are constitutional law, administrative law, federalism, and institutional reform.  She also has served as the faculty advisor to the school's American Constitution Society for Law and Policy chapter.  She has argued for an expanded reading of Article Four of the United States Constitution.

Personal 
Metzger and her husband, New York City Department of Finance Director of Tax Policy Research Michael Hyman, live on Manhattan's Upper West Side. They have two sons, Oliver and Nathaniel Hyman-Metzger.

See also 
 List of law clerks of the Supreme Court of the United States (Seat 6)

References

External links
Columbia University profile
Articles by Gillian Metzger at Harvard Law Review
Profile of Gillian Metzger at the Federalist Society.

1965 births
Living people
American lawyers
Yale University alumni
Columbia Law School alumni
Law clerks of the Supreme Court of the United States
Columbia University faculty
Columbia Law School faculty
Scholars of constitutional law
American women lawyers
Alumni of the University of Oxford
American women legal scholars
American women academics
21st-century American women
American legal scholars